Dicerca juncea is a species of metallic wood-boring beetle in the family Buprestidae. It is endemic to the Southeastern United States, with the type material from the Florida, Alabama, and Georgia. It is an elongate beetle of about  length.

References

Further reading

 
 
 
 
 
 

Buprestidae
Beetles of the United States
Endemic fauna of the United States
Beetles described in 1958